Sami Ben Amar (born 2 March 1998) is a professional footballer who plays as a forward, most recently for Championnat National 2 club Lyon La Duchère. He is a former under-17 international for Morocco.

Club career
Ben Amar made his professional debut for Nîmes in a 2–0 Ligue 2 loss to Gazélec Ajaccio on 23 January 2018. He signed for League of Ireland Premier Division side Dundalk on the 17th August 2021. He made his debut for the club 3 days later in a 2–1 defeat to Drogheda United in the Louth Derby at Oriel Park. His first goal for the club came on 27 August 2021 when he opened the scoring in a 5–1 win over St Mochta's in the Second Round of the FAI Cup. In August 2022, Ben Amar signed for Luxembourg National Division club US Mondorf-les-Bains.

International career
Ben Amar debuted for the Morocco national under-20 football team in a 1–1 friendly tie with the France U20s on 8 November 2017.

Career statistics

References

External links
 
 
 
 Foot Occitanie Profile

1998 births
Living people
Footballers from Nice
Association football forwards
Moroccan footballers
Morocco youth international footballers
French footballers
French sportspeople of Moroccan descent
Nîmes Olympique players
Ligue 1 players
Ligue 2 players
Championnat National 2 players
Championnat National 3 players
League of Ireland players
Dundalk F.C. players
Expatriate association footballers in the Republic of Ireland
US Mondorf-les-Bains players
Luxembourg National Division players
Lyon La Duchère players